God and the State (called by its author The Historical Sophisms of the Doctrinaire School of Communism) is an unfinished manuscript by the Russian anarchist philosopher Mikhail Bakunin, published posthumously in 1882. The work criticises Christianity and the then-burgeoning technocracy movement from a materialist, anarchist and individualist perspective.

Publication 

God and the State was written in February and March 1871. It was originally written as Part II of a greater work that was going to be called The Knouto-Germanic Empire and the Social Revolution. 

The first issue of The Anarchist, published in 1885 in London by Henry Seymour, held an announcement of a translation into English by Marie Le Compte.
The International Publishing Company announced that the profits would go to the Red Cross of the Russian Revolutionary Party.

See also
 Anarchism and religion
 Anarchism in Russia
 Criticism of Christianity
 Criticism of Marxism
 List of books about anarchism

References

External links

 Full text of God and the State
 Full text of God and the State, in PDF, EPub, and multiple other formats
 Audiobook God and the State

1887 non-fiction books
Mikhail Bakunin
Books about anarchism
Books about atheism
Books critical of Christianity
Books critical of religion
Religion and politics
Political books
Unfinished books